Enkomi is a village near Famagusta in Cyprus. It is the site of an important Bronze Age city, possibly the capital of Alasiya. Enkomi is under the de facto control of Northern Cyprus.

In 1974, Enkomi had about 800 Greek Cypriot inhabitants. They all fled to the south of the island after the Turkish invasion, in the aftermath of the July coup. , Enkomi has a population of 2,645. It comprises displaced Turkish Cypriots from Larnaca and Turkish settlers from Adana Province and Trabzon Province.

History

Enkomi was settled in the Middle Bronze Age, near an inlet from the sea (now silted up). From about the 16th century BC to the 12th, it was an important trading center for copper, which was smelted at the site, with strong cultural links to Ugarit on the facing coast of Syria.

The complicated and badly disturbed stratigraphy of the site has in four major phases, with many subdivisions:
 Level A, a poorly represented preliminary stratum on bedrock;
 Level I A, and B, at the beginning of the Late Bronze Age, when fortifications were twice destroyed;
 Level II A, and B, with many subdivisions, covering the elaborate expansion of the 14th and 13th centuries and ending in a mass destruction about 1220;
 Level III A, B, and C, with Mycenaean settlers, with a destructive attack, possibly related to the Sea Peoples in IIIA, culturally continuous with IIIB, ending in a destruction about 1125, and IIIC, a final, Mycenaean phase with dwindling population.

During the 13th century BC, Enkomi was inhabited by Greeks, like most of the cities of Cyprus.   From the 13th century, other towns along the southern coast of Cyprus competed with Enkomi. After an earthquake ca. 1050 BC, the site was abandoned, leaving an opening for the rise of Salamis.

Alasia
René Dussaud said that Enkomi is the Alasia of the Amarna correspondence and other texts, including Hittite texts. Long after the town disappeared, Hellenes recalled it in the cult title of Apollo Alasiotas, recorded in a Cypriote inscription as late as the 4th century BC.  In 1900 the archaeologist Joseph Offord suggested that Apollo Alasiotas was a Syrian god identical with Resheph, transported to Cyprus, and some modern scholars remain unconvinced. The bronze statuette of a horned god (illustration) may represent this divinity whom Greeks identified, by interpretatio graeca, with Apollo.

Excavation

Following more than a decade of widespread looting drawn by the high quality of the tomb gifts, A. S. Murray worked there for the British Museum in 1894–1896. From the 1930s, excavations were continued by a joint expedition between Claude F. A. Schaeffer for the French Expedition and Porphyrios Dikaios on behalf of the Cyprus Department of Antiquities. Notable finds from Enkomi include Linear C inscriptions and the so-called "horned god", a bronze statuette dated to the early 12th century BC, depicting a deity wearing a horned helmet. Another well-known statue is the "ingot god", a statue wearing a horned conical hat and greaves, armed with shield and spear, and standing on a miniature hide-shaped ingot.

A decorated metal cup, the "Enkomi Cup" has been controversially claimed to use niello decoration, which would make it one of the earliest uses of this technique.  However, controversy has continued since the 1960s as to whether the material used actually is niello.

Notes

Literature

External links
 Enkomi on the Department of Antiquities' website 

Bronze Age Cyprus
Cities in ancient Cyprus
Archaeological sites in Cyprus
Communities in Famagusta District
Populated places in Gazimağusa District
Greek Cypriot villages depopulated during the 1974 Turkish invasion of Cyprus
Late Bronze Age collapse